Calamotropha abjectella is a moth in the family Crambidae. It was described by Snellen in 1872. It is found in Angola and Mozambique.

References

Crambinae
Moths described in 1872